Unterallgäu is a Landkreis (district) in Swabia, Bavaria, Germany. Neighboring districts are (from the north clockwise) Neu-Ulm, Günzburg, Augsburg, Ostallgäu, Oberallgäu, and the districts Ravensburg und Biberach in Baden-Württemberg. The district-free city Memmingen in the west of the district is nearly surrounded by the district. The capital of the district is Mindelheim.

Geography
The district is located in the Allgäu, the northern foothills of the Alps. The river Iller forms part of the western boundary of the district.

History
The district was created July 1, 1972 by merging the previous districts Mindelheim and Memmingen. Mindelheim is the administrative seat of the new district.

Partnerships
The district started a partnership with the Polish Gostyn County in 2001.

Coat of arms
The rose in the left of the coat of arms is the symbol of the abbey of Ottobeuren, which ruled the southern part of the district. The fleur-de-lis in the right stands for the Fugger family, who owned several estates in the district. To the bottom are the Bavarian lozenges, to symbolize that the area became part of Bavaria in 1814.

Towns and municipalities

Towns
 Bad Wörishofen
 Mindelheim

Märkte
 Babenhausen
 Bad Grönenbach
 Dirlewang
 Erkheim
 Kirchheim in Schwaben
 Legau
 Markt Rettenbach
 Markt Wald
 Ottobeuren
 Pfaffenhausen
 Türkheim
 Tussenhausen

Verwaltungsgemeinschaften
 Babenhausen
 Boos
 Dirlewang
 Erkheim
 Bad Grönenbach
 Kirchheim (Schwaben)
 Memmingerberg
 Ottobeuren
 Pfaffenhausen
 Türkheim

Municipalities

References

External links

 Official website (German)
 Orchids in Allgäu

 
Districts of Bavaria
Mittelschwaben
Swabia (Bavaria)